Trouble is the debut studio album by singer-songwriter Ray LaMontagne. It was released on September 14, 2004, in the United States, and on September 20, 2004, in the United Kingdom. Although the album was released in 2004, the song didn't enter the top five of the UK charts until August 2006. The album was produced by Ethan Johns, released on RCA Records, marketed by BMG and distributed by Stone Dwarf Records. The album has sold 239,000 copies in the United States, according to Nielsen SoundScan. Jennifer Stills and Sara Watkins are featured on several tracks. The album cover was designed by Jason Holley, and was chosen by LaMontagne as a "powerful and poetic piece of art".

Track listing

Personnel
Ray LaMontagne – vocals, acoustic guitar, harmonica
Ethan Johns – producer, engineer, mixing, string arrangements, additional guitar, drums, percussion, piano, bass guitar, harmonium
David Low – cello, contractor
Julie Gigante – violin
Phillipe Levy – violin
Mark Robertson – violin
Roger Wilkie – violin
Sara Watkins – fiddle on "Hannah" and "Jolene"; backing vocals on "Hannah"
Jen Stills – backing vocals on "Narrow Escape"

Technical
Chris Reynolds – engineer
Ashley Newton, Steve Ralbovsky, James Cerreta – A&R
Robin C. Hendrickson, Brett Kilroe – art direction

Charts

Weekly charts

Year-end charts

Certifications

Covers
Popular Australian singer-songwriter Missy Higgins did a cover for the song "Burn" on January 20, 2005, at the Cairns Convention Centre in Australia. "Jolene," was also covered by the Zac Brown Band, a country music band.

Usage in media
"Burn", "Trouble", and "All the Wild Horses" were all featured in the second season of the American television show Rescue Me. 

The song "Shelter" was featured in the film Prime (2005).

The song "How Come" was featured in the film The Devil Wears Prada (2006).

"Hold You In My Arms" was featured in the 2007 season finale of the television show Grey's Anatomy. 

The song "Jolene" plays during the ending credits of the film The Town (2010).

References

2004 debut albums
Ray LaMontagne albums
RCA Records albums
Albums produced by Ethan Johns